Silvio Messaglia (died 1544) was a Roman Catholic prelate who served as Bishop of Avellino e Frigento (1520–1544).

Biography
Silvio Messaglia was ordained a priest in the Cistercian Order. On 28 March 1520, he was appointed during the papacy of Pope Leo X as Bishop of Avellino e Frigento. He served as Bishop of Avellino e Frigento until his death in 1544.

References

External links and additional sources
 (for Chronology of Bishops) 
 (for Chronology of Bishops) 

16th-century Italian Roman Catholic bishops
Bishops appointed by Pope Leo X
1544 deaths
Cistercian bishops